Mal-e Kayid (also Romanized as Māl-e Kāyīd; also known as Māl-e Qāyed) is a village in Howmeh-ye Sharqi Rural District, in the Central District of Ramhormoz County, Khuzestan Province, Iran. At the 2006 census, its population was 367, in 76 families.

References 

Populated places in Ramhormoz County